Adam Kingsmill (born March 3, 2000) is a Canadian ice sledge hockey player.  He competed at the 2022 Winter Paralympics in Para ice hockey, winning a silver medal. Kingsmill also won a silver medal after competing at the 2021 World Para Ice Hockey Championships.

Early life
Kingsmill was born on March 3, 2000, in Smithers, British Columbia, Canada. Although he was born able-bodied, he lost his right leg below the knee in a lawnmower accident when he was a toddler. Kingsmill used a prosthetic leg growing up, which allowed him to play stand-up minor hockey in 2013, 2014, and 2015. Beyond ice hockey, Kingsmill also participated in motocross racing and finished in the top five at the Pine Valley Motocross Association race in 2014. During the 2015–16 season, Kingsmill was one of 120 prospects invited to participate at the Cariboo Cougars Under-18 AAA club's three-day evaluation camp.

Career
As a result of his tryout for the Cariboo Cougars Under-18 AAA club, Kingsmill was invited to Hockey Canada's NextGen Prospects Camp in 2016. During the NextGen Prospects Camp, Kingsmill tried sledge hockey for the first time as he "never really had the opportunity being from a really small town." Within the year, Kingsmill moved in with a Calgary billet family so he could join the Hockey Canada western training hub. While continuing his sledge hockey training, he enrolled at Mount Royal University to complete his Bachelor of Health and Physical Education with a focus on athletic therapy. As a student, he worked with the National Hockey League's Calgary Flames during their pre-season testing.

Kingsmill made his international sledge hockey debut with Hockey Canada at the 2021 World Para Ice Hockey Championships. He helped Team Canada win a silver medal after losing in the gold medal game to the United States sledge hockey team. Following the loss, Kingsmill was named to the Canadian Paralympic team in September 2021 and he shared goaltending duties with teammate Dominic Larocque throughout the tournament. After meeting the United States again in the gold medal round, Kingsmill and his team earned a silver medal for the second time.

References 

2000 births
Living people
Ice hockey people from British Columbia
Canadian sledge hockey players
Medalists at the 2022 Winter Paralympics
Para ice hockey players at the 2022 Winter Paralympics
Paralympic silver medalists for Canada
Paralympic medalists in sledge hockey
Paralympic sledge hockey players of Canada
